The Mount Tremper Fire Observation Station is a historic fire observation station located on Mount Tremper at Shandaken in Ulster County, New York. The tower is a prefabricated structure built by the Aermotor Corporation to provide a front line of defense in preserving the Catskill Park from the hazards of forest fires.

It was added to the National Register of Historic Places in 2001.

See also
 Catskill Mountain fire towers
 National Register of Historic Places listings in Ulster County, New York

References

External links

The Fire Towers of New York

Government buildings on the National Register of Historic Places in New York (state)
Towers completed in 1917
Buildings and structures in Ulster County, New York
Fire lookout towers in Catskill Park
Fire lookout towers on the National Register of Historic Places in New York (state)
National Register of Historic Places in Ulster County, New York
1917 establishments in New York (state)